Heathcote Junction railway station is located on the North East line in Victoria, Australia. It serves the town of Heathcote Junction, and opened on 17 March 1890 as Kilmore Junction. It was renamed Heathcote Junction on 15 May 1922.

History
A crossing loop, named Summit, was opened at the location in November 1885, but closed in January 1886, after duplication works on the North East line were completed. Soon afterwards, surveyors planning the route of a branch line to Kilmore, and later to Heathcote, selected the site as the junction of the branch.

In 1887, a junction was provided for construction trains on the new Kilmore line, which branched off to the west of the station, passing behind the down platform, with the points facing Melbourne. In 1888, a signal box, named Kilmore Junction, opened on the eastern side of the main line, but a station was not provided until March 1890. It had only small passenger shelters and no goods facilities. Even though the branch line north-west to Heathcote, and thence to Bendigo, was opened in 1890, the station was not renamed Heathcote Junction until 15 May 1922.

In 1950, flashing light signals were provided at the nearby Escrites Road level crossing, located in the down direction from the station. By 1958, the up platform (Platform 1) had been reduced in length, from 376 feet to 150 feet.

In 1962, the Melbourne-Albury standard gauge line opened. It was built behind Platform 1, so the signal box had to be replaced by a new structure to the west of the main lines. It was located on Platform 2 at the up end of the station, between the main line and the branch line. The branch line closed in 1968, with the signal box following in 1970. It was demolished in February 1973, although the foundations can still be seen.

In 1990, the present station shelters were provided. In 1998, boom barriers were provided at the Escrites Road level crossing.

The pedestrian crossing at the up end of the station was upgraded in 2006/2007.

Platforms and services
Heathcote Junction has two side platforms. It is served by V/Line Seymour line trains and selected Shepparton line trains, with most Shepparton services running express through the station.

Platform 1:
 services to Southern Cross
 weekend services to Southern Cross

Platform 2:
 services to Seymour
 one weekday early morning and two weekend services to Shepparton

References

External links
Victorian Railway Stations gallery

Railway stations in Australia opened in 1885
Regional railway stations in Victoria (Australia)
Shire of Mitchell